An overworld is the area within a video game that interconnects all its locations.

Overworld may also refer to:

 Overworld (band), a Swedish alt-metal group
 Overworld (Savant album), a 2012 electronic music album by Aleksander Vinter under the alias "Savant"
 Overworld (Machinae Supremacy album), a 2008 album by metal band Machinae Supremacy
 Heaven, the firmament, or the celestial spheres

See also
Underworld (disambiguation)
Surface of the Earth
Upper World (disambiguation)